The 68th Primetime Emmy Awards honored the best in US prime time television programming from June 1, 2015 until May 31, 2016, as chosen by the Academy of Television Arts & Sciences. The ceremony was held on Sunday, September 18, 2016 at the Microsoft Theater in Downtown Los Angeles, California, and was broadcast in the U.S. by ABC. The ceremony was hosted by Jimmy Kimmel. It was preceded by the 68th Primetime Creative Arts Emmy Awards, which took place over two nights, September 10 and 11, at the Microsoft Theater.

The nominations were announced by Anthony Anderson and Lauren Graham on July 14, 2016. The crime anthology limited series The People v. O. J. Simpson: American Crime Story was the most nominated program at the ceremony with 13, and 22 overall, although Game of Thrones received the most overall nominations that year with 23 as the most nominated drama series.

With five awards, The People v. O. J. Simpson: American Crime Story won the most awards of the night, while the fantasy drama series Game of Thrones won three, including Outstanding Drama Series and surpassed Frasier (37) as the fictional television program with the most Primetime Emmy Awards with 38 wins in six seasons. The Game of Thrones win was also the second time a Sixth season of any show, had won the Outstanding Drama award, after fellow HBO show, The Sopranos Sixth season had won it, in 2007.

Additionally, the political satire series Veep won Outstanding Comedy Series for the second time in a row, while its producer and lead star Julia Louis-Dreyfus established a new record of wins for Outstanding Lead Actress in a Comedy Series; it was her fifth consecutive win for the series, sixth overall in the category and her seventh overall win as an actor.

For the first time, none of the nominees for Outstanding Supporting Actress in a Drama Series were from the four major American broadcasting TV networks. In addition, Ben Mendelsohn became the first actor to win Outstanding Supporting Actor in a Drama Series for a series from a streaming service network; he won for Bloodline from Netflix.

This is the first and, as of 2020, the only ceremony where no network received more than one nomination in the Drama Series category. That feat has never been done in the Comedy Series category.

Winners and nominees

Winners are listed first, highlighted in boldface, and indicated with a double dagger (‡). For simplicity, producers who received nominations for program awards have been omitted.

Programs

Acting

Lead performances

Supporting performances

Directing

Writing

Most major nominations
By network
 HBO – 40
 FX – 28
 Netflix – 17
 ABC – 12
 AMC – 9
 Showtime – 8
 Amazon / CBS / NBC / PBS – 6
 Comedy Central – 5
 Fox – 4
 BBC America / Lifetime / USA – 3

By program
 The People v. O. J. Simpson: American Crime Story (FX) – 13
 Veep (HBO) – 10
 Game of Thrones (HBO) – 9
 Fargo (FX) – 8
 The Night Manager (AMC) / Silicon Valley (HBO) – 6

Most major awards
By network
 FX / HBO – 6
 Netflix – 3
 Amazon / NBC / PBS – 2

By program
 The People v. O. J. Simpson: American Crime Story (FX) – 5
 Game of Thrones (HBO) – 3
 Transparent (Amazon) / Veep (HBO) – 2

Notes

Presenters and performers
The awards were presented by the following:

Presenters

Performers

In Memoriam
Very early on in the show, Jeffrey Tambor paid tribute to Garry Shandling. Later, before introducing the segment, Henry Winkler paid tribute to producer, actor and director Garry Marshall. Singer-songwriter Tori Kelly sang "Hallelujah" as photos were shown of television industry personalities who had died in the past year.

 Jackie Collins
 Ret Turner
 Anton Yelchin
 John Saunders
 Robert Loggia
 Ken Howard
 Morley Safer
 Doris Roberts
 Murray Weissman
 Steven Hill
 Al Molinaro
 Garry Shandling
 Kathy Fortine
 Muhammad Ali
 David Canary
 William Schallert
 Merle Haggard
 Alan Rickman
 Renee Valente
 Fred Thompson
 Abe Vigoda
 Fyvush Finkel
 Ann Morgan Guilbert
 Ian Sander
 Natalie Cole
 Sean Whitesell
 Howard West
 Noel Neill
 Jack Larson
 John McLaughlin
 David Bowie
 Arthur Hiller
 Glenn Frey
 Michael Stevens
 Dan Haggerty
 Wayne Rogers
 Patty Duke
 Alan Young
 George Kennedy
 Jon Polito
 Hugh O'Brian
 Gene Wilder
 Prince

Notes

References

External links
 Emmys.com list of 2016 Nominees & Winners
 Academy of Television Arts and Sciences website
 
 

2016 awards in the United States
Primetime
Primetime Emmy
Primetime Emmy Awards, 68th
068
September 2016 events in the United States
Television shows directed by Glenn Weiss
Works by Jeff Loveness